Stephen T. Goudge  is a justice of the Court of Appeal for Ontario, Canada.

Life and career 
Goudge is a graduate of University of Toronto Faculty of Law. He had been appointed Queen's Counsel in 1982. Goudge was the commissioner of the Goudge Inquiry, which investigated forensic pathology in Ontario in 2007 and 2008.

His father was the philosopher T. A. Goudge.

References

Year of birth missing (living people)
Living people
Justices of the Court of Appeal for Ontario